The G.C. Murphy Building, better known as "The Murphy" or "The Murphy Building" was built in 1884 and is located at 1043 Virginia Avenue in the historic Fountain Square District of Indianapolis, Indiana, United States. The G.C. Murphy Building was once made up of separate buildings, but was joined in 1951 to become part of the now defunct chain of five and dime stores of the same name.

The Murphy Art Center is an arts center located in the G. C. Murphy Building. The Center houses five galleries, 23 artist's studios, a supplier of art materials, an Italian restaurant, an English Pub and a salon/gallery combination. The building is also home to the offices of MOKB Presents and their venue, The HIFI.

The building is listed on the National Register of Historic Places as a contributing property to the Fountain Square Commercial Areas Thematic Resources.

References

External links
 A Short History of the G.C. Murphy Company
 Murphy Art Center website
 indplsartcenter.org

Commercial buildings completed in 1884
Buildings and structures in Indianapolis
Commercial buildings in Indiana
Tourist attractions in Indianapolis
Arts centers in Indiana
Contemporary art galleries in the United States
Art museums and galleries in Indiana
Historic district contributing properties in Indiana
National Register of Historic Places in Indianapolis
Commercial buildings on the National Register of Historic Places in Indiana
1884 establishments in Indiana
Fountain Square, Indianapolis